Mark Chapman (born December 27, 1994) is an American football wide receiver who is currently a free agent. He was most recently a member of the Salt Lake Stallions of the Alliance of American Football (AAF). Chapman played college football at Central Michigan. He was selected by the Hamilton Tiger-Cats with the first overall pick in the 2018 CFL Draft.

Professional career

CFL
On May 3, 2018, Chapman was selected with the first overall pick in the 2018 CFL Draft by the Hamilton Tiger-Cats, after trading up with the Montreal Alouettes.  Despite this, Chapman remained unsigned through May 20, 2018, despite the Tiger-Cats signing several other players that they drafted. Chapman attended one of the Tiger-Cats early regular season games, but left without having signed a contract.

NFL
On May 14, 2018, Chapman received a tryout for the New York Giants of the NFL. Chapman signed a contract with the Denver Broncos on July 25, 2018. He was waived by the Broncos on September 1, 2018.

AAF 
In September 2018 Chapman decided to sign with the Salt Lake Stallions of the Alliance of American Football (AAF), who would begin play in February 2019. However, Chapman never played for the Stallions, citing personal reasons.

References

External links
Central Michigan bio

1994 births
Living people
People from Port Huron, Michigan
Sportspeople from Metro Detroit
Players of American football from Michigan
American sportspeople of Canadian descent
American football wide receivers
Central Michigan Chippewas football players
Denver Broncos players
Salt Lake Stallions players